Albi Çekiçi (born 28 October 1992) is an Albanian footballer who plays as a forward for Besa in the Albanian First Division.

Honours

Club
KS Pogradeci
Albanian First Division: 2010–11

FC Kamza
Albanian First Division: 2016–17

References

1992 births
Living people
People from Pogradec
Albanian footballers
Association football midfielders
Association football forwards
KS Pogradeci players
FC Kamza players
Besa Kavajë players
Kategoria e Parë players
Kategoria Superiore players